Calytrix nematoclada is a species of plant in the myrtle family Myrtaceae that is endemic to Western Australia.

The shrub typically grows to a height of  but can reach . It usually blooms between September and January producing pink to purple flowers.

Found on sand-plains with a scattered distribution through the southern Wheatbelt region of Western Australia  where it grows on sandy soils.

The species was first formally described by the botanist Lyndley Craven in 1987 in the article A taxonomic revision of Calytrix Labill. (Myrtaceae) in the journal Brunonia.

References

Plants described in 1987
nematoclada
Flora of Western Australia